Lac des Corbeaux is a lake in Vosges, France.

Lakes of Vosges (department)
Glacial lakes of France